Anne Washburn is an American playwright.

Life
Washburn graduated from Reed College and from New York University, with an M.F.A.

Her plays have been produced in New York City by Cherry Lane Theatre, Clubbed Thumb, The Civilians, Vineyard Theatre, Dixon Place, and Soho Repertory Theatre—and elsewhere by American Repertory Theater, Woolly Mammoth Theatre Company, New Jersey's Two River Theater Company, Washington DC's Studio Theater, and London's Gate Theatre and Almeida Theatre.

Her 2012 play Mr. Burns, a Post-Electric Play received a Drama League Award nomination for Outstanding Production and was praised by The New York Times as "downright brilliant." Her play A Devil at Noon was featured at the 2011 Humana Festival of New American Plays and the play Sleep Rock Thy Brain—written with Rinne Groff and Lucas Hnath—was featured at the 2013  Festival. In 2015,  10 Out of 12 played at the Soho Rep theater.

Washburn is a member of 13P, an associated artist with The Civilians and New Georges, and an alumna of New Dramatists.  Her work has been published in American Theatre magazine.

Awards and honors
2007 Guggenheim fellowship 
2015 Whiting Award
2015 PEN/Laura Pels Theater Award, American Playwright in Mid-Career
2016 Herb Alpert Award in the Arts in Theatre

Plays

 2019 Shipwreck
 2018 Little Bunny Foo Foo
 2017 The Twilight Zone
 2016 Antlia Pneumatica
 2015 Iphigenia in Aulis, a transadaptation, based on Euripides' Iphigenia in Aulis
 2015 10 Out of 12
 2012 Mr. Burns, a Post-Electric Play
 2011 A Devil at Noon
 2010 The Small 
 2010 Orestes, a transadaptation, based on Euripides' Orestes
 2008 October/November
 2006 I Have Loved Strangers
 2004 The Internationalist
 2004 The Ladies
 2003 Apparition
 2001 The Communist Dracula Pageant
 1999 Everything Not Forbidden Is Permitted (Or Vice Versa)
 1998 Refreshment of the Spirit

References

External links

 Anne Washburn at the Internet Off Broadway Database
 doollee.com: Plays by Anne Washburn
Profile and Production History at The Whiting Foundation

American women dramatists and playwrights
Writers from Berkeley, California
New York University alumni
Reed College alumni
Living people
Year of birth missing (living people)
20th-century American dramatists and playwrights
20th-century American women writers
21st-century American dramatists and playwrights
21st-century American women writers